Dr. Jessica Pearsall Gardner (born July 1971) has been the University librarian of the University of Cambridge in England since April 2017. She is the second woman in the history of the university to hold the position. She was formerly University Librarian at the University of Bristol., and prior to that Head of Library and Culture Services at the University of Exeter. She is a Fellow of Selwyn College. She received a doctorate in modern literary archives from the University of Leeds.

References

1971 births
Living people
Academics of the University of Bristol
Cambridge University Librarians
People from Hounslow
English librarians
Alumni of the University of Leeds
British women librarians
Academic librarians